James White (born 21 January 1980) is a former Australian rules footballer who played with Richmond in the Australian Football League (AFL) in 2000.

References

External links

Living people
1980 births
Australian rules footballers from Victoria (Australia)
Richmond Football Club players
Oakleigh Chargers players